Maria Baltaga-Savițki (1854 – 1904) was a physician from the Bessarabia Governorate of the Russian Empire.

She became the first indigenous female physician in what is now Moldova in 1879. She studied medicine in the University of Zürich in 1874.

References

1854 births
1904 deaths
Moldovan physicians